Ricki Franklin is an American television producer. She was KCET Director of Cultural Programs for the Public Broadcasting System network (PBS). She has been nominated for numerous Emmy Awards, and produced American Playhouse.

References

External links

American television producers
American women television producers
PBS people
Living people
Year of birth missing (living people)
21st-century American women